David Silver  (born 1976) is a British computer scientist and businessman who leads the reinforcement learning research group at DeepMind and was lead researcher on AlphaGo, AlphaZero and co-lead on AlphaStar.

Education 
He graduated from the University of Cambridge in 1997 with the Addison-Wesley award, and befriended Demis Hassabis whilst there. Silver returned to academia in 2004 at the University of Alberta to study for a PhD on reinforcement learning, where he co-introduced the algorithms used in the first master-level 9×9 Go programs and graduated in 2009. His version of program MoGo (co-authored with Sylvain Gelly) was one of the strongest Go programs as of 2009.

Career 
After graduating from university, Silver co-founded the video games company Elixir Studios, where he was CTO and lead programmer, receiving several awards for technology and innovation.

Silver was awarded a Royal Society University Research Fellowship in 2011, and subsequently became a lecturer at University College London, where he is now a professor. His lectures on Reinforcement Learning are available on YouTube. Silver consulted for DeepMind from its inception, joining full-time in 2013.

His recent work has focused on combining reinforcement learning with deep learning, including a program that learns to play Atari games directly from pixels.  Silver led the AlphaGo project, culminating in the first program to defeat a top professional player in the full-size game of Go. AlphaGo subsequently received an honorary 9 Dan Professional Certification; and won the Cannes Lion award for innovation. He then led development of AlphaZero, which used the same AI to learn to play Go from scratch (learning only by playing itself and not from human games) before learning to play chess and shogi in the same way, to higher levels than any other computer program.

Silver is among the most published members of staff at DeepMind, with over 130,000 citations and has an h-index of 78.

He was awarded the 2019 ACM Prize in Computing for breakthrough advances in computer game-playing.

In 2021, Silver was elected Fellow of the Royal Society for his contributions to Deep Q-Networks and AlphaGo.

References

Alumni of the University of Cambridge
Computer programmers
Go (game) researchers
Living people
AlphaGo
University of Alberta alumni
Academics of University College London
1970s births
Year of birth missing (living people)